Cydia saltitans or jumping bean moth is a moth from Mexico that is most widely known as its larva, where it inhabits the carpels of seeds from several related shrubby trees, mainly Sebastiania pavoniana or  Sapium biloculare (syn. Pleradenophora bilocularis). These seeds are commonly known as Mexican jumping beans.

The moth lays the egg on the young capsule. The hatched larva gnaws into the fruit, which closes the minute hole during its growth.
The larva attaches itself to the capsule with many silken threads by hooks on its anal and four hind abdominal prolegs. When the fruit is warmed, for instance by being held in the palm of the hand, the larva twitches, pulling on the threads and causing the characteristic hop. "Jump" is often an exaggeration, but the beans nonetheless do move around quite a bit.

The larva may live for months inside the fruit with periods of inactivity.  It eats away the seed inside the capsule, making a hollow for itself. If the fruit is cut, the larva will repair the hole with silk.

If the larva has suitable conditions such as moisture, it will live long enough to go into a pupal stage.
In preparation for this, it eats a circular hole through the shell and closes it again with a silken plug. This is to enable the jawless adult moth to escape from the fruit. After completion of the exit hole it spins a cocoon within the fruit, with a passageway leading to the opening. During the following pupal stage the larva will not move any more.
Normally in the spring, the moth will force its way out of what remains of the fruit, through the round "trapdoor", leaving behind the pupal casing.

The small, jawless silver and gray-colored moth will live for only a few days.

Nomenclature
In most of the historical literature prior to 2020, the name of this species is given as deshaisiana and attributed to Lucas, 1858. However, careful examination of the source literature revealed that Lucas' name has never been available (a nomen nudum under the ICZN rules), and also that Westwood's original name, Carpocapsa saltitans, had evidently been introduced earlier in that same year (Westwood's first appeared in July 1858 and Lucas' in November). Westwood coined the name using elements referring to the behavior; carpo and capsa indicating that it lives within a seed (see podocarp), and saltitans referring to its jumping behavior.

See also
Calindoea trifascialis, a moth that jumps inside a rolled up leaf 'sleeping bag'
Colliguaja odorifera, a related jumping seed plant
Emporia melanobasis, a moth with similar habits, parasitizing in Spirostachys africana.
the California jumping gall wasp (Neuroterus saltatorius) shows similar behavior in galls produced in several oak species, although during the pupal stage.
Nanodes tamarisci, acting similarly in the seed of Tamarix.
Sapium biloculare or the Arizona jumping bean, a related plant with jumping seeds
Spirostachys africana, the jumping seed parasitized by Emporia melanobasis
Tortricidae, the family of moths containing many of the jumping species

References
 (1876). Jumping Seeds and Galls. American Naturalist, Vol. 10(4): 216–218.

External links
 Information on Jumping Beans
 Gallery

Grapholitini
Moths described in 1858
Moths of Central America